A list of crime film originally released in the 2020s.

2020

2021

2022

2023

TBA

References

Crime films
2020s